Donna Perry may refer to:
Donna Perry (model) (born 1971), American model and actress
Donna Perry (serial killer), American murderer